Oh Wonder are an English, London-based alt-pop duo consisting of Anthony Vander West (né West) and Josephine Vander West (née Vander Gucht). Since releasing their debut album, they have seen international success with their alt-pop singles. Oh Wonder recorded and released one song a month for a year, starting in September 2014. All of the songs were released together as a self-titled debut album on 4 September 2015. On 14 July 2017, the duo released their second album, Ultralife. On 12 February 2020, they released their third album, No One Else Can Wear Your Crown. On 8 October 2021, the now-married duo released their fourth studio album, 22 Break. All four albums were written, recorded, produced, and mixed by the duo and have seen cross-platform success.

The band played sold-out shows in London, Paris, New York, and Los Angeles one week after their debut album release, which marked the beginning of their touring career. They have since played multiple headline shows and festivals in numerous countries.

History

Formation and early years
Before Oh Wonder was formed, Vander Gucht was a solo artist, first going by her own name and later under the alias LAYLA. Anthony West was originally part of the groups Tonight Is Goodbye, Futures, and We the Wild. The two first met in High Wycombe on 21 March 2010, when West was in the audience at one of Vander Gucht's solo gigs. A year later, Vander Gucht attended one of West's gigs, talked with him, and they began writing songs and making music together.

The duo released their first two songs under the name Wonder Wonder but changed it to Oh Wonder when they learned of another band with a similar name.

2014–2016: Oh Wonder

Oh Wonder had an unorthodox approach to releasing their eponymous debut album, Oh Wonder. Over the course of a year, the duo released one new single each month, beginning 1 September 2014, having written, produced, and mixed each song in their home studio in London. These monthly installations culminated in the 2015 release of that first album, which also included two previously unreleased songs. The record reached number 26 on the UK Albums Chart, number 16 on the Canadian Albums Chart, and number 80 on the US Billboard 200.

Oh Wonder has sold over one million copies worldwide (the first-ever album to do so on an independent label) and has been certified Gold in the UK, Canada, Singapore, China, Taiwan, and Denmark, and Platinum in Russia and the Philippines.

Oh Wonder gave their debut live performance for BBC Radio 1 at Maida Vale Studios, after receiving avid support from BBC Introducing and DJs Huw Stephens and Greg James. The band's first TV performance was on Conan, which aired in the US on 20 January 2016. They performed their single "Lose It".

Since their debut album release, Oh Wonder has toured internationally in the United Kingdom, France, Belgium, Germany, Sweden, Norway, Denmark, Netherlands, Russia, Australia, Canada, and the United States. Their performance in Manila was their first show in Asia. They also toured as the opening act on the final installment of the Badlands Tour with Halsey from 21 July to 12 August 2016. Their 2016 debut festival appearances included Bonnaroo, Firefly, and Lollapalooza music festivals in the United States, in addition to Live Out in Monterrey, WayHome Festival in Oro-Medonte, Canada, and Electric Picnic in Stradbally, Ireland.

2016–2018: Ultralife

On 30 March 2017, Oh Wonder announced that they'd finished their second studio album, to be titled Ultralife. The record's lead track, "Ultralife", was released the day after. As with their previous album, the group released new singles every two weeks in the run-up to the album's publication.

The duo embarked on the Ultralife World Tour in 2017, which saw them play a long run of headline shows in 34 countries across Asia, Australia, Europe, and North and South America. They also played three shows with Beck on his 2018 North America Tour.

2019–2020: No One Else Can Wear Your Crown and Home Tapes

On 5 September 2019, Oh Wonder released "Hallelujah", the first single from their upcoming album, followed by "Better Now" on 25 October and "I Wish I Never Met You" on 14 November. The same day, they announced via Twitter that the album, titled No One Else Can Wear Your Crown, would be released on 7 November. This was followed by the singles "This Christmas", "Happy", and "In and Out of Love". As part of the press coverage around their third album, Vander Gucht and West revealed they were in a relationship and had been for the past seven years.

The pair were to embark on a tour to support No One Else Can Wear Your Crown throughout Europe and North America in March 2020; however, the latter part of the tour, including the entirety of the North American segment, was postponed due to the COVID-19 pandemic.

Whilst subject to the 2020 UK "stay at home" restrictions related to the novel coronavirus, Oh Wonder released a series of new tracks on an EP titled Home Tapes.

2021: 22 Break
On 22 September 2021, Oh Wonder announced their fourth studio album, 22 Break, and released the eponymous title track. Described by the duo as "maybe the first break-up album in history written and recorded with the person you're breaking up with", the album documents their near-split in 2020 during the COVID-19 pandemic and their time away from touring. The record was released to critical acclaim on 8 October 2021, alongside a visual film featuring music from the album.

2022: 22 Make
On 7 October 2022, Oh Wonder released a sequel album to 22 Break as a celebration of their relationship.

NOLA Coffee
Oh Wonder run a coffee shop named NOLA Coffee, located in the London district of Peckham. "NOLA is an embodiment of all their favourite experiences of cafes around the world distilled into one beautiful space".

Discography

Studio albums

EP
 Home Tapes (2020)

Singles

As lead artist

As featured artist

Featured appearances

Songwriting and production credits

References

External links

 

Musical groups established in 2014
English musical duos
Island Records artists
Male–female musical duos
2014 establishments in England
Dew Process artists
English pop music groups
Electronic music duos
English electronic music duos
English pop music duos
English synth-pop groups
British indie pop groups